For information on all Texas A&M University–Commerce sports, see Texas A&M–Commerce Lions
The Texas A&M–Commerce Lions men's basketball team (formerly the East Texas State Lions) is the men's intercollegiate basketball program representing Texas A&M University–Commerce. The school competes in the Southland Conference (SLC) in Division I of the National Collegiate Athletic Association (NCAA). For their first 91 years of existence, they competed in the Lone Star Conference of Division II. The Lions were members of the NAIB from 1931 to 1940, the NAIA from 1940 to 1982, and joined the NCAA for the 82–83 season. The A&M–Commerce men's basketball team plays its home games at the University Field House on the university campus in Commerce, Texas. The Lions have won one NAIA National Championship during the 1954–55 season, 21 Lone Star Conference Championships, and have made National Playoff tournaments 19 times, 11 as a member of the NAIA and 8 as a member of the NCAA Division II since joining DII in 1982. The team is currently coached by Jaret Von Rosenberg.

History

Early years and NAIB membership
The men's team was formed in 1916, and then joined the Lone Star Conference (LSC) in 1931 and won their first conference championship under Jules V. Sikes in 1934. Sikes left Commerce to become head football coach at the University of Kansas and returned to Commerce in 1954 as head football coach. Sikes was replaced by S. J. Petty, who led the Lions to an LSC title in 1936. Dennis Vinzant became head coach in 1937 and the team saw its first national tournament in 1940 as they were invited to the NAIB national tournament in Kansas City, losing in the first round to Pittsburg State, 55–33.

Joining the NAIA
The Lions joined the National Association of Intercollegiate Athletics (NAIA) for Basketball for the 1940–1941 season. Due to World War II breaking out, seasons in the mid 1940s were either shortened or cancelled, and Vinzent stopped coaching Basketball after the 1945 season after notching a 92–60 record and two Lone Star Conference Championships. Darrell Tully assumed head coaching duties and led the Lions to a conference title in 1948 and two appearances in the NAIA postseason playoffs. Milburn Smith led the team to the NAIA National Tournament in 1950 and conference title before becoming the head football coach at the University and having tremendous success. Jack Woodruff coached for one season in 1951 before leaving.

Championships under Bob Rogers
Bob Rogers arrived in Commerce in 1952 and from 1952 to 1956, the Lions had an immense amount of success. Rogers amassed a record of 113–34, Conference Championships in 1953, 1954, and 1955. Additionally, the program went to the NAIA National Tournament all of those years as well. The 1953 team finished in NAIA Final Four, losing to Hamline College and then losing the National third place game to Indiana State University by 3 points. In the 1954 tournament, the Lions defeated North Texas, Portland State, and Geneva College before losing to Southwest Missouri State in overtime. Entering the 1955 tournament, ET finally broke through by sailing through the tournament and defeating Southeastern Oklahoma State University 71–54 in the National Championship Game. It was the final time the Lions would make the National tournament under Rogers, despite having winning records in 1956 and a conference title in 1957 before leaving Commerce to become head coach for Texas A&M University.

Norman Pilgrim Era
Norman Pilgrim became head coach and the Lions had another run of success under his tenure. Pilgrim coached from 1957 to 1967 and he won two Lone Star Conference Championships in 1958 and 1964. The team returned to the NAIA Elite 8 in 1958. In 1964 ET qualified for the postseason yet again, but lost in the NAIA District playoff to St. Mary's. In 1966, the Lions played Texas Western University's (now The University of Texas at El Paso) historic color barrier breaking team. The game was featured in the Walt Disney film Glory Road. This caused controversy as in the film, the East Texas squad and fans were shown to be very hostile to the Texas Western Black players. In reality, the Lions suited up 3 Black players and the game was played in El Paso and resulted in a 73-51 Miner win, rather than the close and tense affair played in Commerce. Pilgrim amassed a 152–126 record before retiring.

Jim Gudger Years
From 1969 to 1982, Jim Gudger coached the Lions with mostly successful seasons. The team had won the Lone Star Conference 3 times (1974, 1977, 1978) and were selected for the National Tournament times as well. Losing in the first round in 1974, Gudger's 1977 team went to the Elite 8, where they bowed out to Texas Southern. In 1978 the team lost to eventual National Champion Quincy in the NAIA final four, and lost in the first round to St. Mary's in 1979. Gudger retired in 1982 after winning 202 games, second most in program history. 1982 was also the final year the Lions would compete in the NAIA.

NCAA Membership & Jerry Matthews/Paul Peak Years
In 1982, the East Texas State and Lone Star Conference left the NAIA and joined the NCAA. Jerry Matthews coached from 1983 to 1990, winning 99 games and winning conference championships in 1984 and 1990. Paul Peak coached team from 1991 to 1999. Under Peak, the Lions won the LSC in 1996 and 1998. The team went to the NCAA tournament for the first time since joining the NCAA in 1996, losing to Central Missouri in the First Round. In 1997 the Lions qualified for the NCAA Elite 8 before losing to Northern Kentucky. In 1998 the Lions returned to the NCAA tournament for the third straight year, losing in the first round.

Sam Walker Era
Peak's Assistant Coach Sam Walker became Head Coach in 2000. Under Walker, the Lions won 285 games, had 10 winning seasons, and a Lone Star Conference Championship in 2005 and 2015. Walker's 2005 team went to the NCAA Elite 8 and won the Lone Star Conference Championship in 2015 and went back to the NCAA tournament, before losing in the first round to conference foe Angelo State in the NCAA first round. In Walker's final season in 2017, the Lions again qualified for the NCAA Tournament. Walker retired from coaching in 2017 to take another position with the University. His 285 wins make him the winningest coach in program history.

Current Era
Jaret von Rosenberg became the  current head coach in 2017 and currently holds an 88-46 record. In his first two seasons, the Lions finished second overall in the Conference during the 2017–18 and the 2018–19 seasons and also qualified for the NCAA tournament, finishing as NCAA South Central Region Semi-finalists both times. After falling in the LSC Semifinals during the 2019-20 season, the Lions would miss out on the LSC Tournament for the 2020-21 season after slumping to a 7-7 record.

To start the 2021-22 season, the Lions defeated the UTSA Roadrunners 65-62 in an exhibition game. The Lions would return to both the LSC and Regional Tournaments, but suffered first round exits in both.

Coaches

Arena

The A&M-Commerce men and women's basketball teams both share the university field house along with volleyball . The field house was constructed in 1950 and has been home to Men's basketball for over six decades. The Field House covers 69,000 square feet and will seat 5,000 people for either a volleyball or basketball contest. The facility is also the host to the University's Athletic Administration staff, the Sports Medicine Department and the Health and Human Performance Department; in addition to the offices for the basketball, cross country and track and field, golf, soccer and volleyball teams.

The Field House is shaped like an airplane hangar and has space for three basketball courts crossways. The floor allows three games to be played at the same time under one roof. The one lengthwise court is reserved for A&M-Commerce basketball and volleyball matches. With an arched roof, 58 feet from the ground at the highest point, is supported on steel beams that are stationed at one end. The university recently upgraded the hardwood court and placed a giant lion head logo in the center of the court similar to the one at Memorial Stadium.

Notable former players 
Devondrick Walker basketball player for New Basket Brindisi of the Italian Lega Basket Serie A (LBA)
Darrell Williams (born 1989), basketball player for Bnei Herzliya of the Israeli Premier League

See also
Texas A&M-Commerce Lions women's basketball

References

External links